The 1971–72 Ranji Trophy was the 38th season of the Ranji Trophy. Bombay won their 14th title in a row defeating Bengal in the final.

Highlights
Bengal was captained in the final by former Indian football captain Chuni Goswami.

Group stage

East Zone

South Zone

North Zone

Central Zone

West Zone

Knockout stage

(T) – Advanced to next round by spin of coin.

Final

Scorecards and averages
Cricketarchive

References

External links

1972 in Indian cricket
Ranji Trophy seasons
Domestic cricket competitions in 1971–72